The ARIA Music Award for Best Blues and Roots Album, is an award presented at the annual ARIA Music Awards, which recognises "the many achievements of Aussie artists across all music genres", since 1987. It is handed out by the Australian Recording Industry Association (ARIA), an organisation whose aim is "to advance the interests of the Australian record industry."
To be eligible, the recording must be an album in the contemporary and traditional blues genres, and contemporary adaptations of Australian traditional music and/or folklore. The submitted work cannot be entered in other genre categories. The accolade is voted for by a judging school, which comprises between 40 and 100 members of representatives experienced in these genres, and is given to a solo artist or group who is either from Australia or an Australian resident.

The award for Best Blues and Roots Album has been won the most times (3) by both The Audreys, for Between Last Night and Us (2006), When the Flood Comes (2008) and Sometimes the Stars (2010); and the John Butler Trio, for Sunrise Over Sea (2004), Grand National (2007) and Flesh & Blood (2014).

Winners and nominees
In the following table, the winner is highlighted in a separate colour, and in boldface; the nominees are those that are not highlighted or in boldface.

References

External links
The ARIA Awards Official website

B
A
A